Sufan-e Olya (also Romanized as Sūfān-e ‘Olyā, Sofān-e ‘Olyā, and Soofan ‘Olya; also known as Soffān-e Bālā and Şūfān-e Bālā) is a village in Miyan Ab-e Shomali Rural District, in the Central District of Shushtar County, Khuzestan Province, Iran. At the 2006 census, its population was 138, in 27 families.

References 

Populated places in Shushtar County